Clement Bernard "Johnnie" Johnston Sr. (born c. 1895, missing 1933) was an American football and baseball player, coach, and college athletics administrator. He was the second head football coach at Appalachian State Teachers College—now known as Appalachian State University—located in Boone, North Carolina, serving from 1929 to 1932. He played varsity football, basketball and baseball at Wake Forest University, earning letters in all three sports. In addition to coaching at Appalachian State, he also held a coaching position at Clarkson University, for which he was trained at a coaching school at Bucknell University under Fielding H. Yost. He is the grandfather of Cathy Johnston-Forbes.

Disappearance
In 1933, Johnston sent a postcard to his wife from Zanesville, Ohio, stating that he was on his way to Chicago, Illinois to publish a book after being fired as head football coach of Appalachian State Teachers College the previous year. No one heard from him after that.

Head coaching record

College football

See also
 List of people who disappeared

References

Year of birth missing
1890s births
American men's basketball players
Appalachian State Mountaineers athletic directors
Appalachian State Mountaineers baseball coaches
Appalachian State Mountaineers football coaches
Appalachian State Mountaineers men's basketball coaches
Clarkson Golden Knights football coaches
Clarkson Golden Knights men's basketball coaches
Wake Forest Demon Deacons baseball players
Wake Forest Demon Deacons football players
Wake Forest Demon Deacons men's basketball players
High school football coaches in North Carolina
Year of death unknown
1930s missing person cases
Missing person cases in Ohio